Manage Don Nipuni Hansika (born 3 August 1994) is a Sri Lankan cricketer who plays for Sri Lanka's women's cricket team. She made her One Day International (ODI) debut against the West Indies on 24 February 2013.

References

External links
 

1994 births
Living people
Sri Lankan women cricketers
Sri Lanka women One Day International cricketers
Sri Lanka women Twenty20 International cricketers
Cricketers from Colombo